McKenna is a surname of Irish origin. It is the anglicized form of the Gaelic Mac Cionaodha meaning "son of Cionnaith", or of the Scottish surname, from Galloway, "MacCionaodha".

The historical lineage of the McKennas lies in Truagh, County Monaghan, Ulster, Ireland, where they were "The Lords Of Truagh".  In North Kerry, McKenna is considered to come from Mac Ginea. The Cionnath, Cionaoith, Cionaddha forms are considered there to be sources of names like Kenny, Kenney, and Kennedy. A similar Irish surname Ó Cionaodha, also spelt as Ó Cionnaith.

The name is also sometimes used as a given name. This is a list of notable people with this name. Stephanie Ruth McKenna, famous artist from Hull Massachusetts.

Surname
 Alan McKenna (disambiguation), several persons
 Alex McKenna (born 1984), American actress
 Andrew McKenna, American political organizer
 Andrew J. McKenna (born 1929), American businessman
 Antoinette McKenna, Irish musician
 Barney McKenna (1939–2012), Irish musician
 Bernard McKenna (writer) (born 1944), Scottish television writer and producer
 Bernard J. McKenna (1842–1903), American politician
 Brian McKenna (born 1945), Canadian filmmaker
 Buck McKenna, Canadian football coach
 Catherine McKenna (born 1971), Canadian politician
 Charlene McKenna (born 1984), Irish actress
 Charles F. McKenna (1844–1922), American judge
 Chris McKenna (disambiguation), several persons
 Christina McKenna, Irish writer
 Christine McKenna (born 1951), British actress
 Conor McKenna (born 1996), Australian footballer
Conor McKenna, Irish comedian 
 David McKenna (disambiguation), several persons
 Declan McKenna (born 1998), English singer, songwriter and musician
 Dennis McKenna (born 1950), American ethnopharmacologist
 Donald McKenna (disambiguation), several persons
 Eugene McKenna, Northern Irish Gaelic footballer and manager
 Francine McKenna, American journalist, blogger, and columnist
 Francis I. McKenna (1859–1914), American architect, and real estate and land developer
 Frank McKenna (born 1948), Canadian businessman, politician, and diplomat
 Gail McKenna (born 1968), English model, actress, and presenter 
 (Ged McKenna) (born 1956) English actor. 
Gerry McKenna (born 1953), Northern Irish biologist and academic
 Guy McKenna (born 1969), Australian football player and coach 
 Jimmy McKenna (born 1953), Scottish actor
 Joe McKenna (born 1951), Irish hurler
 John McKenna (disambiguation), several persons
 Joseph McKenna (1843–1926), American politician
 Judith McKenna (born 1966/1967), British businesswoman
 Juliet E. McKenna (born 1965), British author
 Ken McKenna (born 1960), English footballer and manager
 Kevin McKenna (disambiguation), several persons
 Kit McKenna (1873–1941), American baseball player
 Kristine McKenna, American journalist, critic and art curator
 Lawrence M. McKenna (1933-2023), American judge
 Lesley McKenna (born 1974), British snowboarder 
 Lori McKenna (born 1968), American folk singer and songwriter
 Malcolm McKenna (1930–2008), American palaeontologist
 Mark McKenna, Irish actor
 Matt McKenna (born 1975), American bassist
 Megan McKenna (born 1992), English television personality 
 Mia McKenna-Bruce (born 1997), English actress
 Michael McKenna (disambiguation), several person
 Niall McKenna  (born 1977), Irish philanthropist for all things Gaelic football 
 Nick McKenna (1895–1974), Australian politician
 Patricia McKenna (born 1957), Irish politician
 Patrick McKenna (born 1960), Canadian actor
 Paul McKenna (born 1963), British hypnotist
 Peter McKenna (born 1946), Australian footballer
 Peter McKenna (footballer) (1901–1964), English footballer
 Reginald McKenna (1863–1943), British politician
 Richard McKenna (1913–1964), American writer
 Rob McKenna (born 1962), American politician
 Rory McKenna (born 1993), New Zealand singer
 Robert McKenna (1927–2015), American Catholic bishop and exorcist
 Ryan McKenna (politician) (born 1973), American politician
 Ryan McKenna (baseball) (born 1997), American baseball player
 Sabrina McKenna (born 1957), American judge
 Sarah McKenna (born 1989), English rugby player
 Scott McKenna, Scottish Footballer
 Sean McKenna (footballer) (born 1987), Scottish footballer
 Sean McKenna (ice hockey) (born 1962), Canadian ice hockey player
 Seana McKenna (born 1956), Canadian stage actor
 Siobhán McKenna (1923–1986), Irish actress
 Stephen McKenna (disambiguation), several persons
 Terence McKenna (1946–2000), American philosopher
 Thomas Patrick McKenna (1929–2011), Irish actor
 Virginia McKenna (born 1931), British actress and writer
 William McKenna (born 1946), American politician
 Willie McKenna (1889–1958), Scottish footballer
 William Mactire McKenna (1958) K&A Kensington, North Philadelphia Shamrock of the Irish Badlanders

Given name
 Makenna Cowgill (born 1998), American child actress
 Mckenna Grace (born 2006), American child actress

Fictional characters
 Elise McKenna, portrayed by Jane Seymore in Somewhere in Time
 Jonathon McKenna, from the New Zealand soap opera Shortland Street
 Rachel McKenna, from the New Zealand soap opera Shortland Street
 Ginger McKenna, portrayed by Sharon Stone in the 1995 film Casino
 Quinn McKenna, portrayed by Boyd Holbrook in the 2018 film "The Predator"

See also
 McKenna (disambiguation)
 MacKenna (disambiguation)
 Kenna (disambiguation)

References

English-language surnames
Surnames of Irish origin
Anglicised Irish-language surnames
Anglicised Scottish Gaelic-language surnames
Patronymic surnames

fr:McKenna
ja:マッケナ
pt:McKenna
ru:Маккенна